Mehlville is a census-designated place (CDP) in south St. Louis County, Missouri, United States, an area locally known as "South County". It is an inner-ring suburb of St. Louis, and part of the Greater St. Louis metropolitan area. The population was 27,971 at the 2020 census.

Geography
Mehlville is located at  (38.504303, -90.312745).

Demographics

At the 2000 census there were 28,822 people, 12,541 households, and 7,775 families living in the CDP. The racial makeup of the CDP was 97.08% White, 0.75% African American, 0.13% Native American, 1.77% Asian, 0.02% Pacific Islander, 0.34% from other races, and 0.61% from two or more races. Hispanic or Latino of any race were 1.45%.

There were 12,541 households, 25.9% had children under the age of 18 living with them, 48.6% were married couples living together, 10.2% had a female householder with no husband present, and 38.0% were non-families. 32.5% of households were one person and 12.7% were one person aged 65 or older. The average household size was 2.27 and the average family size was 2.90.

The age distribution was 21.2% under the age of 18, 9.4% from 18 to 24, 28.3% from 25 to 44, 23.1% from 45 to 64, and 18.0% 65 or older. The median age was 39 years. For every 100 females, there were 89.2 males. For every 100 females age 18 and over, there were 84.9 males.

The median household income was $43,734 and the median family income  was $55,202. Males had a median income of $41,435 versus $27,551 for females. The per capita income for the CDP was $23,125. About 3.7% of families and 5.6% of the population were below the poverty line, including 6.6% of those under age 18 and 5.4% of those age 65 or over.

School districts 
The school district for Mehlville is the Mehlville School District (R-9), which consists of one early childhood preschool program, ten elementary schools, four middle schools, and two high schools, Mehlville High School and Oakville High School. The Mehlville School District has approximately 12,000 students currently enrolled. Only Mehlville High School is in the Mehlville area, located on Lemay Ferry Road.

References

External links
Mehlville School District
Mehlville Fire Protection District

Census-designated places in St. Louis County, Missouri
Census-designated places in Missouri